Clowance Wood is a hamlet in the civil parish of Crowan (where the 2011 census population was included
) in west Cornwall, England.

References

Hamlets in Cornwall